Taiwanese cuisine (Bopomofo:ㄊㄞˊㄨㄢˉㄌㄧㄠˋㄌㄧˇ, or , Bopomofo:ㄊㄞˊㄨㄢˉㄘㄞˋ) has several variations. The earliest known cuisines of Taiwan are that of the Taiwanese indigenous peoples. Over hundred years of historical development; mainstream Taiwanese cuisine has been influenced by Hakka cuisine, the cuisines of the waishengren, Japanese cuisine, and American cuisine. Although southern Fujian cuisine has had the most profound impact.

History and development

Taiwanese culinary history is murky and is intricately tied to patterns of migration and colonization. Local and international Taiwanese cuisine, including its history, is a politically contentious topic. Taiwan's complex and diverse identity makes Taiwanese cuisine hard to communicate.

The history of Taiwanese cuisine began with the cuisine of aboriginal peoples on the island of Taiwan, which existed in the ancient times without written records. From the Ming dynasty in 16th century, a large number of immigrants from the southern provinces of China, especially the Hoklo people, brought the rich Chinese culinary culture to Taiwan. At the same time, Hakka people from Fujian developed a separate cuisine culture from Hoklo people. Because of the influence of Chinese immigration, Taiwanese cuisine often leads to it being classified as 'Southern Chinese cuisine'. Due to the period of Japanese rule, Taiwanese cuisine was also strongly influenced by Japanese washoku and yōshoku. After WWII, the Kuomintang retreat to Taiwan brought along many Chinese cuisines outside the province of Fujian or Southeast China. After that, the dishes from whole mainland China especially Guangdong, Chaoshan, Shanghai, Sichuan and Beijing could be easily found in Taiwan. In the decades since the KMT's retreat these regional dishes have evolved and become part of Taiwanese cuisine.

According to Taiwanese chef Fu Pei-mei, authentic Chinese culinary traditions were properly preserved in Taiwan. This claim to authenticity, common among Fu's generation, was in part due to the Kuomintang's Chinese nationalist political messaging which extended well beyond cuisine.

In the early 21st century ideas about sustainability and local food became more prominent in Taiwanese culinary and agricultural circles.

Ingredients and culture 

Pork, seafood, chicken, rice, and soy are common ingredients. Traditionally, rice formed the basis of most Taiwanese diets. Before the Japanese colonial period, most rice grown in Taiwan was long-grained indica rice. The Japanese introduced short-grained japonica rice which quickly changed both the farming and eating patterns of the Taiwanese. Due to Japanese influence, the Taiwanese generally prefer rice that is plump, aromatic, slightly firm, and sweet. Differences between the Taiwanese and Japanese rice preferences are demonstrated by differences in their cuisine with Taiwan's more flavorful and aggressive cooking methods calling for highly aromatic rice while the Japanese prefer a more subtle and pure taste and smell. During the Japanese Colonial period, Taiwanese cuisine was divided. High-end restaurants, or wine houses, served Chinese cuisine such as Peking duck, shark fin with bird's nest soup, and braised turtle to the colonial elite. In the meantime, those without wealth or connections primarily ate rice, porridge, pickled vegetables, and sweet potato leaves. Cooking oil was considered a luxury and was only used for special occasions.

Taiwan's cuisine has also been influenced by its geographic location. Living on a crowded island, the Taiwanese had to look aside from the farmlands for sources of protein. As a result, seafood figures prominently in their cuisine. This seafood encompasses many different things, from large fish such as tuna and grouper, to sardines and even smaller fish such as anchovies. Crustaceans, squid, and cuttlefish are also eaten. Milkfish is the most popular fish in Taiwanese cuisine; it is valued for its versatility as well as its tender meat and economical price.

Beef is less common than other proteins, and some Taiwanese (particularly the elderly generation) still refrain from eating it. This stems from traditional reluctance toward slaughtering precious cattle needed for agriculture, and an emotional attachment and feeling of gratitude and thanks to the animals traditionally used for very hard labor. However, due to influences from the influx of mainland Chinese in the 1900s, the Taiwanese version of beef noodle soup is now one of the most popular dishes in Taiwan. American food aid in the decades following WWII which primarily consisted of wheat, beef, and processed meats like Spam forever changed the Taiwanese diet with wheat-based noodles, breads, and dumplings taking a more central role in the cuisine. Rice consumption in Taiwan reached a height of 80-90 kilograms per person per year in the 1960s and 1970s before falling as consumers shifted consumption to wheat-based foods. However, the Taiwanese still consume a large quantity of rice, particularly brown rice and exotic varieties like black, purple, and red rice. Recently rice consumption in Taiwan has enjoyed a renaissance with both growers and consumers devoting the level of care and attention to the rice that is given to high-value crops like tea.

Because of the island's sub-tropical location, Taiwan has an abundant supply of various fruit, such as papayas, starfruit, melons, and citrus fruit. A wide variety of tropical fruits, imported and native, are also enjoyed in Taiwan. Other agricultural products in general are rice, corn, tea, pork, poultry, beef, fish and other fruits and vegetables. Fresh ingredients in Taiwan are readily available from markets.

In many of their dishes, the Taiwanese have shown their creativity in their selection of spices. Taiwanese cuisine relies on an abundant array of seasonings for flavor: soy sauce, rice wine, sesame oil, fermented black beans, pickled radish, pickled mustard greens, peanuts, chili peppers, cilantro (sometimes called Chinese parsley) and a local variety of basil.

Taiwanese black vinegar has more in common with Worcestershire sauce than other black vinegars and is considered an outlier among black vinegars. Its base is sticky rice which is then aged with other ingredients in clay pots. It is used as a condiment and seasoning. Kong Yen is the largest producer of Taiwanese black vinegar. According to Bon Appetit, compared to Chinese black vinegars it is "simpler, fruitier, and cleaner."

An important part of Taiwanese cuisine is xiaochi (小吃), substantial snacks along the lines of Spanish tapas or Levantine meze.

The Taiwanese xiaochi has gained much reputation internationally. Many travelers go to Taiwan just for xiǎochī. The most common place to enjoy xiǎochī in Taiwan is in a night market. Each night market also has its own famous xiǎochī.

Moreover, the Taiwanese xiǎochī has entered more "refined" eating environments. Nowadays, Taiwanese xiǎochī can be found in luxury and high-end restaurants. These restaurants use higher quality ingredients and creative presentations, reinventing dishes whilst keeping the robust flavors. The prices usually jump by twice the price or even higher in the restaurants. The Taiwanese government supports the Taiwanese xiǎochī and has held national xiǎochī events in Taiwan regularly.

Modern Taiwanese cuisine is influenced by Taiwan's freedom and openness which enables chefs to innovate and experiment.

Roadside banquet chefs are ubiquitous in Taiwan; these small (often single-person) catering firms provide on-location cooking for wedding banquets and other celebrations often held on the roadside. During the COVID-19 pandemic these chefs saw a significant downturn in business due to the lack of people hosting large traditional functions, especially those around the Lunar New Year.

Vegetarianism and veganism
Vegetarian restaurants are commonplace with a wide variety of dishes, mainly due to the influence of Buddhism and other syncretistic religions like I-Kuan Tao. These vegetarian restaurants vary in style from all-you-can-eat to pay-by-the-weight and the regular order-from-a-menu. Vegetarian restaurants and foods are often marked with a left-facing swastika.

In the 21st century Taiwan has seen a rise in non-religious vegetarians, especially among the young. There has also been a rise in veganism with concerns about animal welfare, personal health, environmental sustainability, and climate change driving both trends. Taiwan's traditional vegetarian products companies have also expanded into the booming fake meat market. The traditional culinary use of fake meat in Taiwan has given Taiwanese companies an edge and Taiwan is now a market leader in the fake meat sector. Taiwanese companies do a significant amount of export business, particularly in the European, North American, and Southeast Asian markets. Hung Yang Foods, one of the largest producers of fake meat products, does 80% of their business overseas with their products being stocked in 90% of Australian supermarkets.

Regional specialities

Typical dishes 

There is a type of outdoor barbecue called . To barbecue in this manner, one first builds a hollow pyramid up with dirt clods. Next, charcoal or wood is burnt inside until the temperature inside the pyramid is very high (the dirt clods should be glowing red). The ingredients to be cooked, such as taro, yam, or chicken, are placed in cans, and the cans are placed inside the pyramid. Finally, the pyramid is toppled over the food until cooked.

Many non-dessert dishes are usually considered snacks, not entrees; that is, they have a similar status to Cantonese dim sum or Spanish tapas. Such dishes are usually only slightly salted, with many vegetables accompanying the main meat or seafood item.

Desserts 

 Aiyu jelly – a gelatinous dessert made from the seeds of a creeping fig, Ficus pumila var. awkeotsang. Served on ice.
  – an ice cream made of taro root paste.
 Tshuah-ping (also known as Baobing) – a Taiwanese shaved ice dessert very common in China, Taiwan, Malaysia, and Vietnam.
 Xue-bing (雪花冰) - also called "xue hua bing," translated to "snow ice," "snowflake ice," or "shaved snow."   This is different from baobing/tshuah-ping in that the base mixture for the ice is creamy (milk is generally added, but it can be dairy or plant based), the ice itself often has a flavor dissolved in (milk, taro, chocolate, coffee, etc.), the texture of the shaved snow is very fine, and it melts near-instantaneously, upon contact.  The ice for this is typically cylindrical, and the shaved snow comes out of the machine in ruffled ribbons.  Some additional common toppings include but are not limited to:  sweetened condensed milk, mangoes, sweetened red beans, sweetened mung beans, boba pearls, or taro. 
 Bubble tea, aka boba milk tea; also known as pearl milk tea - chewy tapioca balls added to milk tea.
 Traditional cakes are not always of the same composition depending on the flavor. There is the moon cake which has a thick filling usually made from lotus seed paste or sweetened red bean paste and surrounded by a relatively thin (2–3 mm) crust and may contain yolks from salted duck eggs. It is traditionally eaten during the festival for lunar worship and moon watching. Mooncakes are offered between friends or on family gatherings while celebrating the festival. The Mid-Autumn Festival is one of the four most important Chinese festivals.

There are other cakes that can mix salty ingredients with sweet ones to create a balance while enjoying these delicacies with tea. The crust could be shiny from applying a layer of egg yolk before putting in the oven, or not in that case it is often whiter and the crust has more layers.
 Grass jelly – (Mesona procumbens) Served hot or cold.
 Moachi, a soft rice cake like Japanese daifuku mochi. Flavors of the fillings can vary, ranging from all kinds of beans to nuts.
 Pineapple cake - a square short crust pie filled with pineapple filling. One of Taiwan's best known dessert pastries and souvenir of choice.
 Chhau-a-koe – Cakes made with a dough from glutinous rice flour and combine with a ground cooked paste of Gnaphalium affine or Mugwort to give it a unique flavor and green color. The dough is commonly filled with ground meat or sweet bean pastes.
Douhua (豆花) - Soft tofu served with syrup and toppings such as peanuts, adzuki beans, tapioca, and mung beans. Served hot or cold.
 Chocolate - Taiwan's cocoa production is centered in Pingtung in Southern Taiwan. As of 2020 approximately 200-300 acres was under cultivation in Pingtung supporting around 30 chocolate making companies. Taiwan is one of the few mature chocolate making countries to also be a cocoa producer.

Night market dishes 
Taiwan's best-known snacks are present in the night markets, where street vendors sell a variety of different foods, from finger foods, drinks, sweets, to sit-down dishes. In these markets, one can also find fried and steamed meat-filled buns, oyster-filled omelets, refreshing fruit ices, and much more. Aside from snacks, appetizers, entrees, and desserts, night markets also have vendors selling clothes, accessories, and offer all kinds of entertainment and products.

In 2014 The Guardian called Taiwan's night markets the "best street food markets in the world".

 Various drinks are also often sold, ranging from bubble tea stands to various juice and tea stands.
 Crêpes - Adapted from the original French version, a thin cooked pancake, it has a much crispier texture, rather like a cracker. They were popular in the early 2000s.
 Fruit or bean smoothies - milk or ice is blended on the spot with fresh papaya, mango, watermelon, azuki bean, or mung bean.
 Fried glutinous rice balls - slightly sweet.

Food of the Taiwanese Aborigines 

Taiwan's food and food culture is very much diversified and largely influenced by the exodus of Han people. However, one part of the Taiwanese food culture that remains integral is that of the Taiwanese indigenous peoples. Though the indigenous population only make up less than 2% of Taiwan's overall population, it is notable that their foods eaten and ways of preparation are distinguishable from the more typical Chinese-influenced cuisine.

The aborigines' diet very much depends on nature. With profuse vegetation and wild animals, the aborigines were natural hunter-gatherers. Essentially, much of what Aborigines ate depended on their environment – that is, whether they lived in coastal or mountainous areas. Tribes like Amis, Atayal, Saisiyat and Bunun hunt what they can, and gather what they cultivate. On the other hand, tribes like the Yamis and the Thao have fish as a predominant source of food. Most foods consisted of millet, taro, sweet potato, wild greens and game like boar and rat. This is in contrast to the main foods eaten by the Han, which consisted of rice and chicken.

Game meats for those living in the mountainous areas include deer, and flying squirrel intestines, a delicacy as regarded by the Bunun people. Another is 'stinky' meat – that is, 'maggoty game' that has begun to rot, which is then barbecued, fried, seasoned with garlic and ginger then served with spicy sauce.
 
The Amis, apart from meat, had much greens to eat, largely due to the belief that anything a cow ate, was also edible by humans.  The Bununs, who are primarily hunters of wild animals, would dine on stone-grilled pork, boar, deer, and hog roast. The Yami tribe, located off Taitung coast, fed on many types of fish, including the prized 'flying fish' (or Alibangbang). A speciality includes rice, mixed with river fish and wild vegetables, served in large bamboo trunks.

Apart from being a staple-food, millet was always produced as wine. Not just for drinking, millet wine played an important role in being used as offerings during festivals, births and weddings. Millet wines are all made in the homes of the Aborigines. Sticky rice is put into a wooden steamer after being soaked in water. Once cooled, the rice is put into a pot of water, then pulled out and combined with rice yeast. After four or five days of being placed in a large jar, the rice is placed in a sieve or rice bag, whilst the alcoholic liquid drips out and is stored away.
 
Also important to the Indigenous Taiwanese people's cuisine are the sweet potato and taro, favored for their perennial nature and low maintenance. The cultivation of root vegetables rather than typical seedling plants was notably prominent, with archaeological evidence suggesting as early as fourth millennium BC, from the Dapenkeng site, in Guanyin Mountain, New Taipei City.
 
Given the versatility of both vegetables, they were usually boiled or steamed, and eaten by itself or as ingredients in soups and stews. Without the need for advanced agricultural technology, taro and sweet potatoes were a prime preference for farming. Canadian missionary George MacKay said of 19th century Taiwan: 'the bulb of the sweet potato is planted in March. In about six weeks the vines are cut into pieces eight inches long, which are planted in drills, and from these vine-cuttings the bulbs grow and are ripe about the end of June. A second crop is planted in a similar way in July and is ripe in November.' (Ibid). The influence of sweet potatoes and taro has been vast. They are still widely present in modern-day Taiwan, be it on the streets, night markets, or in successful food chains like 'Meet Fresh' (or 鮮芋仙).

Due to the absence of contemporary culinary utensils such as the refrigerator, gas stovetops and ovens, the Indigenous resorted to other means to prepare their food. Upon bringing back hunted game meat, the Aborigines would preserve the meat with either millet wine or salt. Another cooking technique involved the heating up of stones by fire, which are then placed inside a vessel with other certain meats and seafood, which are cooked from the heat of the stones. Foods were mostly prepared by steaming, boiling or roasting, in order to infuse flavors together, yet preserve the original flavors. This again is contrasted with the Han, who adopted skills like stir-frying and stewing. Meat was also put on a bamboo spit and cooked over the fire.

A cookbook published in 2000 by the CIP and National Kaohsiung University of Hospitality and Tourism, listed some foods of the main Taiwanese Aboriginal tribes, showing the Aborigines' adherence and passion for natural foods. 
 Amis Nation: Alivongvong (meat and sticky rice dumpling packed in leaves) (阿里鳳鳳); Stir-fried wild vegetables
 Atayal Nation: Grilled meat on stone (石板烤肉); Langying (steamed sticky rice cake) (朗應)
 Bunun Nation: Bunun millet cake (布農粿); Millet rice (小米飯)
 Paiwan Nation: Millet Qinafu (millet and pork meat-ball) (小米奇那富); Jinbole (Sorghum and pork dumpling packed in a banana leaf) (金伯樂)
 Puyuma Nation: Yinafei mountain cake (以那馡山地粿); Fried wild rat with basil (九層野鼠)
 Rukai Nation: Qinabu (taro and meat dumpling) (奇那步); Grilled boar
 Saisiyat Nation: Grilled boar with papaya (木瓜拌山豬肉); Assorted wild flowers (野花拼盤); Cassava and spareribs soup (樹薯排骨湯)
 Tsou Nation: Bamboo cooked rice (竹筒飯); Banana cake (香蕉糕)
 Yami Nation: Boiled taro and crab (芋泥加蟹肉); Grilled fish Steamed dried fish (蒸魚乾)

Modern aboriginal cuisine
Though Taiwan is home to many cuisines, there are still restaurants which keep the spirit of Aborigine cuisine alive. Whilst chefs in such restaurants may need to tweak traditional recipes to suit contemporary tastebuds, emphasis of natural foods is still extant. The annual Indigenous Peoples Healthy Cuisine and Innovative Beverage Competition, partly sponsored by the Council of Indigenous Peoples and the Tourism Bureau provides prize money to contestants who creatively use traditional indigenous ingredients in healthy ways. Other similar competitions are held by local governments (such as Kaohsiung City). In Tainan, indigenous people may sell their food at the Cha Ha Mu Aboriginal Park. Such trends are all to promote the wonderful taste of Aboriginal Taiwanese cuisine.

Silaw is an Amis dish of pickled pork.

The importance of wild greens to aboriginal cuisine is being increasingly appreciated. Wild greens refers to both wild plants found in the forest and to those same plants cultivated in domestic gardens.

Beverages
The Taiwanese drink less alcohol per capita than neighboring South Koreans and Japanese. This is believed to be because approximately half of Taiwan’s population does not possess the necessary gene to successfully metabolize alcohol. During the Japanese colonial period the production of alcoholic beverages was industrialized and in 1922 production of alcohol was monopolized by the colonial authorities. Modern Taiwanese drinking culture and beverage production is still influenced by the Japanese colonial period.

Beer

Beer is a popular beverage in Taiwan. Taiwan both imports and produces a wide variety of beers from mass market lagers to niche craft ales. Some of the well-developed brands include Long Chuan (龍泉), Le Blé d'Or (金色三麥), Jolly Brewery+Restaurant (卓莉手工醸啤酒泰食餐廳), North Taiwan Brewing (北台灣麥酒) and Taihu Brewing (臺虎精釀).

Coffee
The first coffee plants on Taiwan were imported by the British to Tainan in 1884 with the first significant small scale cultivation taking place in New Taipei City's Sanxia District. Tainan remains the heart of Taiwanese coffee culture. Production reached a peak in 1941 following the introduction of arabica coffee plants by the Japanese colonial authorities. Domestic production is small but of high quality, imported beans account for the vast majority of coffee sold in Taiwan. In 2016 domestic production was 900 tons while 30,000 tons was imported.

By 2020 there were more than 15,000 coffee shops in Taiwan. In 2020 average coffee consumption surpassed average tea consumption for the first time.

Kaoliang liquor

Kinmen Kaoliang Liquor is one of the most popular brands of kaoliang liquor in Taiwan. As its name indicates, it is produced on the island of Kinmen. The mainstays of the range are the standard 58 percent and 38 percent alcohol bottlings. Kinmen's kaoliang production traces its roots back to the Chinese Civil War when Chinese nationalist general Hu Lien encouraged Kinmenese farmers to grow sorghum to produce hard liquor as importing alcohol from Taiwan caused financial strain. Kaoliang liquor has become an integral part of Kinmen's economy and plays a significant role in the culture of Kinmen.

Yusan Kaoliang Chiew is produced by the Taiwan Tobacco and Liquor Corporation. It is named after the highest mountain in Taiwan, Yushan. One of the most notable products in the range is an "X.O." kaoliang aged for five years in tanks before bottling.

Matsu Tunnel 88 Kaoliang Liquor is produced by the Matsu Distillery in Nangan Township, Lienchiang County. The name is derived from the name of an abandoned military tunnel called Tunnel 88 which the distillery took over as storage space for their kaoliang and aged rice wine. All of the distillery's aged kaoliangs are stored in the tunnel for at least five years.

Rum
Commercial rum production was introduced into Taiwan along with commercial sugar production during the Japanese colonial period. Rum production continued under the ROC however it was neglected by Taiwan Tobacco and Liquor Corporation which held the national liquor monopoly. The industry diversified after democratization and the de-monopolization of the Taiwanese alcoholic beverage industry.

Tea

Taiwanese tea is considered among the best in the world and the country has a unique tea culture.

Whisky

Taiwan has a young but thriving whisky industry buoyed by a massive domestic market for whisky, especially single malt scotch. Taiwan is the only whisky market which drinks more single malt whisky than blended whisky.

Wine

Independent winemaking was illegal in Taiwan for a long time due to the monopoly granted to the Taiwan Tobacco and Liquor Corporation. Independent winemakers became legal in 2002 and in 2014 a Taiwanese wine won its first gold medal at an international competition. In 2019 a red wine from Taichung was awarded a gold medal at the 25th Vinalies Internationales in France. Two of the most acclaimed wineries are Domaine Shu Sheng and Weightstone Vineyard Estate & Winery. Although it was once largely lost Taiwan's indigenous winemaking culture is staging a comeback.

Sake
Sake consumption started during the Japanese colonial period. The first sake was made in Taiwan in 1914, the largest contemporary domestic brand is Yuchun produced by the Taiwan Tobacco and Liquor Corporation. A number of smaller producers also exist with an emphasis placed on unique products made with local rice. Taiwan also imports large amounts of sake from Japan. It's proximity and the volume of the trade allows merchants in Taiwan to stock fresh and limited production sake which is not widely available elsewhere outside Japan.

Fine dining

Fine dining in Taiwan is often of a mixed identity. For example, wedding banquets in Taiwan typically feature Japanese sashimi as the first course with traditional Taiwanese and Chinese dishes following.

The Michelin Guide began reviewing restaurants in Taipei in 2018 and Taichung in 2020. The 2020 Michelin awarded stars to 30 restaurants in Taiwan, four in Taichung and 26 in Taipei. With three stars the cantonese restaurant Le Palais is the country's highest rated restaurant. The 2020 list also bestowed the Bib Gourmand on 54 restaurants in Taipei and 21 in Taichung. There are significant differences between the fine dining scenes in Taipei and Taichung. In Taichung an emphasis is placed on ceremony with large tables and private rooms common, a premium is also placed on parking with restaurants having more than 100 parking spaces. This is due in part to Taichung's strong small and medium enterprises as well as a multitude of informal recreational and fraternal organizations. In Taipei fine dining restaurants and tables are generally smaller with most customers being couples or small groups, in general service is less formal than in Taichung. In Taipei there is more international influence in the fine dining scene while Taichung retains a strong affinity with traditional dishes.

Foreign cuisine in Taiwan

Fusion
Fusion cuisine is very popular in Taiwan. Many Taiwanese dishes are a result of cultural fusion, such as the Taiwanese version of pastel de nata which are a legacy of Portuguese colonialism in neighboring Macao.

Italian
Italian cuisine has been popular in Taiwan for a long time, but the country had few authentic Italian restaurants and even fewer Italian chefs until the late 1990s and early 2000s. Due to the financial crisis of 2007–08, a large number of Italians emigrated from Italy to healthier economies. This led to a rapid increase in both the number of Italian restaurants and the number of Italian expats in Taiwan. While most restaurants follow the traditional Italian course style, the meal proportions are influenced by Italian-American cuisine. Taiwanese diners have become increasingly passionate and discerning about Italian cuisine. Michael de Prenda was one of the innovators of Italian cuisine in Taiwan, starting multiple restaurants, a market, and a farm.

Pizza 
Pizza is one of the most popular foods in Taiwan. The first pizza restaurant opened in the 1970s and the industry grew rapidly in the 2000s driven by a increasing demand for quality Italian and American style pizza from an affluent younger generation which had spent time abroad and brought back a taste for it.

Chain pizza restaurants like Pizza Hut and Domino's Pizza are known for running promotional pizzas with outrageous toppings like spicy hotpot, cilantro and century egg with pig’s blood, beef and kiwi, glutinous rice, ramen, and stinky tofu in an attempt to get national and international publicity. Pizza Hut entered the Taiwanese market in 1986 and Domino's followed in the late 1980s. In 2022 each company had more than 150 stores in Taiwan.

Indian
Indian food became popular in Taiwan in the 2000s. The number of Indian restaurants has grown along with the growth of the Indian and larger South Asian community in Taiwan however most customers in Indian restaurants are local with Indian food also being found in university cafeterias and other institutional settings.

Russian
Along with the fleeing KMT came White Russian refugees who had sought shelter from the Russian Revolution in China. George Elsner founded the first Russian restaurant, The Café Astoria, in Taiwan in 1949. The Café Astoria was a center of Russian expat life in Taiwan during its early years. Chiang Ching-kuo and his Russian wife, Faina Vakhreva, often brought their children with them to eat there. Elsner died stateless in Taiwan.

Nordic
Nordic haute cuisine is popular in Taiwan's major cities, with restaurants offering both authentic Nordic cuisine and Nordic cuisine adapted to local ingredients and tastes.

Hong Kong
The increase in immigration from Hong Kong following the pro-democracy protests brought an increased focus on Hong Kong cuisine, along with a fusion between Hong Kong and Taiwan cuisines. Taiwan is considered a safe haven for Hongkongers, with many opening shops and restaurants to serve food they were unable to find in Taiwan, or which they did not feel was up to Hong Kong standards.

Japanese
Taiwan, in particularly Taipei, is regarded as having some of the best Japanese food outside of Japan. This is due to the legacy of Japanese colonialism as well as ongoing cultural and commercial exchange.

Taiwanese cuisine abroad

Taiwanese cuisine has a global presence. Taiwanese chefs have been extremely successful abroad cooking both Taiwanese and international cuisine. Well known chefs include André Chiang.

United States
Taiwanese immigrant restaurateurs were largely responsible for the shift of American Chinese food from Cantonese-focused cuisine to diverse cuisine featuring dishes from many regions in China. The immigration of Taiwanese chefs to the United States began in the 1950s. At the time, cooks in Taiwan were trained in traditional Chinese regional cooking as this fit the chosen identity of the KMT. Taiwanese restaurateurs changed the food landscape of many American cities, including New York City, and pioneered innovations such as picture menus and food delivery. Many of the immigrants to the United States during this period had been born in mainland China and fled to Taiwan with the retreating KMT, particularly former residents of the Dachen Islands who had been evacuated in 1955.

Traditionally, Taiwanese food has been hard to differentiate from Chinese and Japanese food abroad, since many Taiwanese chefs cooked simplified or westernized versions of traditional Taiwanese, Japanese, or Chinese dishes. In 2018, there was a rapid growth in the number of authentic Taiwanese restaurants in New York City and across the country, which coincided with an increased interest in regional Chinese food and in Taiwan itself. Some object to the politically fraught inclusion of Taiwanese cuisine under the banner of regional Chinese food and point out that it is inaccurate.

Taiwanese American cuisine is emerging as a full cuisine in its own right. Myers + Chang in Boston was one of the first restaurants to explicitly describe their food as such. In 2018, James Beard Award-winning chef Stephanie Izard opened a Taiwanese snack/dessert shop in Chicago. Taiwanese cuisine has a significant presence in the San Francisco Bay Area.

Culinary education
Historically, culinary education was informal with apprentices learning from a master for many years before they practice the craft on their own. The first college level course in cooking was implemented in 1986 at Danshui Technical College.

Culinary schools
 Danshui Technical College
 National Kaohsiung University of Hospitality and Tourism

See also

 Agriculture in Taiwan
 Maritime industries of Taiwan
 Q texture
 List of restaurants in Taiwan

References

Further reading

External links